Sainte-Marguerite-sur-Fauville is a former commune in the Seine-Maritime département in the Normandy region in northern France. On 1 January 2017, it was merged into the new commune Terres-de-Caux.

Inhabitants are called Sainte-Margueritais (male) or Sainte-Margueritaises (female).

Geography

Coat of arms

Population

Places of interest
 A sandstone cross.
 The church of St.Marguerite, dating from the seventeenth century.

See also
Communes of the Seine-Maritime department

References

Former communes of Seine-Maritime